Marathounta is a village in the Paphos District of Cyprus, located 6 km east of Paphos. Marathounta is located at 323 m above sea level. Marathounta is a small traditional village that brings peace and quiet to its visitors. Although not far from the hectic Paphos with its infrastructures, it manages to maintain a more rural character, at the same time enjoying the privileges of its proximity to the urban center. For those who want to visit the area, there is a tavern with local appetizers, as well as in neighboring Armou, but for further infrastructure facilities there is the city or the more developed Konia, just 5 minutes away by car.

References

Communities in Paphos District